United States Mountain is a  mountain summit located in Ouray County of southwest Colorado, United States. It is situated six miles southwest of the community of Ouray, on land managed by Uncompahgre National Forest. It is part of the Sneffels Range which is a subset of the San Juan Mountains, which in turn is part of the Rocky Mountains. It is set west of the Continental Divide, 2.3 miles south of Potosi Peak, and 2.5 miles southeast of Stony Mountain. Recreation enthusiasts heading for Yankee Boy Basin traverse below the northern base of the mountain. Mining activity in the immediate area produced significant amounts of gold and silver. The Hidden Treasure Mine is a gold mine located on the south slope at 11,759-feet elevation.

Climate 
According to the Köppen climate classification system, United States Mountain is located in an alpine subarctic climate zone with long, cold, snowy winters, and cool to warm summers. Due to its altitude, it receives precipitation all year, as snow in winter, and as thunderstorms in summer, with a dry period in late spring. Precipitation runoff from the mountain drains into Canyon Creek which is a tributary of the Uncompahgre River.

Gallery

See also

References

External links 

 Weather forecast: United States Mountain

Mountains of Ouray County, Colorado
San Juan Mountains (Colorado)
Mountains of Colorado
North American 3000 m summits
Uncompahgre National Forest